Luís Melo (born November 13, 1947, in Curitiba) is a Brazilian actor.

Filmography

Television 
1985 Cata-Vento - Gororóba
1995 Cara e Coroa - Rubinho
1997 Anjo Mau - Müller
1997 O Amor Está no Ar - Alberto
1998 Pecado Capital - Ricardo
1998 Hilda Furacão - Padre Ciro
1999 Suave Veneno - Ramalho
1999 O Auto da Compadecida - The Devil
2000 O Cravo e a Rosa - Nicanor Batista
2000 A Invenção do Brasil - Vasco de Athaíde
2000 A Muralha - Manuel
2001 A Padroeira - Molina
2003 A Casa das Sete Mulheres - Bento Manuel
2004 Um Só Coração - Cândido Portinari
2005 América - Ramiro
2006 Cobras & Lagartos - Orã Munhoz/Conchita
2006 JK - Coronel Licurgo
2007 Eterna Magia - Dr. Rafael (Tio Rafa)
2008 Faça Sua História - Delegado Nicanor
2008 Casos e Acasos - Linhares
2009 Cinquentinha - Joaquim Coutinho
2010 A Princesa e o Vagabundo - Conde Graco de Lafayette
2010 A Vida Alheia - Delano Silva
2010 Na Forma da Lei - João Carlos Viegas
2011 Chico Xavier - João Cândido
2011 Morde & Assopra - Oséas
2012 Amor Eterno Amor - Dimas
2013 Amor a vida - Atilio
2016 Sol Nascente - Tanaka

Cinema 
 Encarnação do Demônio
 Cafundó
 Gaijin - Ama-me Como Sou
 Separações
 Olga
 Caramuru - A Invenção do Brasil
 Por Trás do Pano
 O Auto da Compadecida
 Terra Estrangeira
 Doces Poderes
 Jenipapo
 Chico Xavier

Theater 
 Macunaíma (Mário de Andrade)
 A Hora e a Vez De Augusto Matraga (Guimarães Rosa)
 Xica da Silva, (Luis Alberto de Abreu)
 Paraíso Zona Norte (Nélson Rodrigues)
 Nova Velha História (do mito Chapeuzinho Vermelho)
 Trono de Sangue / MacBeth (William Shakespeare)
 Vereda da Salvação (Jorge de Andrade)
 Gilgamesh (baseado no poema épico sumério)
 Sonata Kreutzer (baseado em conto de Tolstoi)
 Salomé (Oscar Wilde)
 Cão Coisa e a Coisa Homem
 Daqui a 200 Anos

References

1947 births
Living people
Male actors from Curitiba
Brazilian male film actors
Brazilian male telenovela actors
Brazilian male stage actors